Marcos Alzueta (born 16 August 1996) is an Argentine professional footballer who plays as a forward.

Career
Alzueta started his career with Santamarina. He was selected for his debut by manager Duilio Botella, who substituted the forward on for the last two minutes of a 3–1 loss against Estudiantes on 7 March 2014. After the club won the title in 2013–14, they were promoted to Primera B Nacional which allowed Alzueta to make his professional bow on 4 July 2015 versus Unión Mar del Plata.

Career statistics
.

Honours
Santamarina
Torneo Argentino A: 2013–14

References

External links

1996 births
Living people
People from Tandil
Argentine footballers
Association football forwards
Torneo Argentino A players
Primera Nacional players
Club y Biblioteca Ramón Santamarina footballers
Sportspeople from Buenos Aires Province